Linnell Camp is a census-designated place (CDP) in Tulare County, California. The 2010 United States census reported Linnell Camp's population was 849.

Geography
According to the United States Census Bureau, the CDP covers an area of 0.1 square miles (0.3 km), all of it land.

Demographics

At the 2010 census Linnell Camp had a population of 849. The racial makeup of Linnell Camp was 397 (46.8%) White, 3 (0.4%) African American, 18 (2.1%) Native American, 8 (0.9%) Asian, 0 (0.0%) Pacific Islander, 393 (46.3%) from other races, and 30 (3.5%) from two or more races. Hispanic or Latino of any race were 832 people (98.0%).

The whole population lived in households, no one lived in non-institutionalized group quarters and no one was institutionalized.

There were 193 households, 155 (80.3%) had children under the age of 18 living in them, 146 (75.6%) were opposite-sex married couples living together, 14 (7.3%) had a female householder with no husband present, 24 (12.4%) had a male householder with no wife present.  There were 21 (10.9%) unmarried opposite-sex partnerships, and 0 (0%) same-sex married couples or partnerships. 7 households (3.6%) were one person and 5 (2.6%) had someone living alone who was 65 or older. The average household size was 4.40.  There were 184 families (95.3% of households); the average family size was 4.44.

The age distribution was 355 people (41.8%) under the age of 18, 109 people (12.8%) aged 18 to 24, 251 people (29.6%) aged 25 to 44, 116 people (13.7%) aged 45 to 64, and 18 people (2.1%) who were 65 or older.  The median age was 21.9 years. For every 100 females, there were 96.1 males.  For every 100 females age 18 and over, there were 101.6 males.

There were 193 housing units at an average density of 1,647.7 per square mile, of the occupied units 4 (2.1%) were owner-occupied and 189 (97.9%) were rented. The homeowner vacancy rate was 0%; the rental vacancy rate was 0%.  15 people (1.8% of the population) lived in owner-occupied housing units and 834 people (98.2%) lived in rental housing units.

References

Census-designated places in Tulare County, California
Census-designated places in California